Hotel Hello is a duo album by vibraphonist Gary Burton and bassist Steve Swallow. Burton also plays marimba and organ, and Swallow doubles on acoustic & electric piano.

Reception

The Penguin Guide to Jazz listed the album as part of its suggested "core collection" and described it as "by far the most impressive of Burton's two-handers and an ideal opportunity to examine the vibist in close-ups." They concluded by calling it "one of the high-points of ECM's distinguished catalogue."

Writing for Between Sound and Space, Tyran Grillo called the album a "long-forgotten jewel," and commented: "Hotel Hello is a unique entry in the Burton catalogue, for it is the only one that feels as if it were painted in black and white. What it lacks in vibrancy... of color, it makes up for, if not surpasses, in its visceral sentiment... This is a consistently solid effort and arousing in its many changes..."

In a review for AllMusic, Scott Yanow wrote: "the music is introverted, quiet, and occasionally swinging, but mostly floating... Thoughtful background music with no real surprises or excitement."

Track listing

"Chelsea Bells (for Hern)" (Steve Swallow) - 4:25
"Hotel Overture + Vamp" - 3:39
"Hotel Hello" (Steve Swallow) - 5:24
"Inside In" (Mike Gibbs) - 2:43
"Domino Biscuit" (Steve Swallow) - 1:56
"Vashkar" (Carla Bley) - 5:58
"Sweet Henry" (Steve Swallow, Jack Gregg) - 4:02
"Impromptu" (Gary Burton, Steve Swallow) - 2:29
"Sweeping Up" (Steve Swallow) - 5:24

Personnel
Gary Burton – vibraharp, organ, marimba
Steve Swallow – bass, acoustic piano, electric piano

References

1975 albums
Gary Burton albums
Steve Swallow albums
ECM Records albums
Albums produced by Manfred Eicher